The 2010 Hong Kong Sevens is a rugby union sevens tournament, part of the 2009–10 IRB Sevens World Series. The competition was held from March 26–28 in at Hong Kong Stadium in Hong Kong and featured 24 teams.  Samoa won its third consecutive Cup after defeating New Zealand in the final.  With the victory, Samoa moved into first place in the World Series standings.

Format 
Qualification for the various trophy brackets is as follows:
Cup and Plate — The six pool winners, plus the two top-rated second-place teams
Bowl — The four remaining second-place teams, plus the four top-rated third-place teams
Shield — The eight remaining teams

The 2010 edition saw several significant changes to the tournament format. Foremost among these changes was the introduction of the fourth-level Shield trophy, which had not previously been awarded in Hong Kong. More important within the context of the IRB Sevens as a whole, the Cup and Plate are now contested in the same manner as in other competitions, with the losing quarterfinalists in the Cup parachuting into the Plate semifinals.

Teams

Incident
One spectator dressed in fancy costume invaded the pitch. He jumped down from the south stand, climbed onto the crossbar at the south end of the stadium for several minutes whilst hapless security guards watched; he dodged back into the stands and evaded capture.

Pool stages

Pool A
{| class="wikitable" style="text-align: center;"
|-
!width="200"|Team
!width="40"|Pld
!width="40"|W
!width="40"|D
!width="40"|L
!width="40"|PF
!width="40"|PA
!width="40"|+/-
!width="40"|Pts
|- 
|align=left| 
|3||3||0||0||85||38||47||9
|- 
|align=left| 
|3||2||0||1||75||33||42||7
|- 
|align=left| 
|3||1||0||2||26||94||-68||5
|- 
|align=left| 
|3||0||0||3||36||57||-21||3
|}

Pool B
{| class="wikitable" style="text-align: center;"
|-
!width="200"|Team
!width="40"|Pld
!width="40"|W
!width="40"|D
!width="40"|L
!width="40"|PF
!width="40"|PA
!width="40"|+/-
!width="40"|Pts
|- 
|align=left| 
|3||3||0||0||117||10||107||9
|- 
|align=left| 
|3||2||0||1||75||55||20||7
|- 
|align=left| 
|3||1||0||2||54||39||15||5
|- 
|align=left| 
|3||0||0||3||22||164||-142||3
|}

Pool C
{| class="wikitable" style="text-align: center;"
|-
!width="200"|Team
!width="40"|Pld
!width="40"|W
!width="40"|D
!width="40"|L
!width="40"|PF
!width="40"|PA
!width="40"|+/-
!width="40"|Pts
|- 
|align=left| 
|3||3||0||0||165||26||139||9
|- 
|align=left| 
|3||2||0||1||91||48||43||7
|- 
|align=left| 
|3||1||0||2||67||62||5||5
|- 
|align=left| 
|3||0||0||3||7||194||-187||3
|}

Pool D
{| class="wikitable" style="text-align: center;"
|-
!width="200"|Team
!width="40"|Pld
!width="40"|W
!width="40"|D
!width="40"|L
!width="40"|PF
!width="40"|PA
!width="40"|+/-
!width="40"|Pts
|- 
|align=left| 
|3||3||0||0||114||36||78||9
|- 
|align=left| 
|3||2||0||1||36||53||-17||7
|- 
|align=left| 
|3||1||0||2||63||57||6||5
|- 
|align=left| 
|3||0||0||3||31||98||-67||3
|}

Pool E
{| class="wikitable" style="text-align: center;"
|-
!width="200"|Team
!width="40"|Pld
!width="40"|W
!width="40"|D
!width="40"|L
!width="40"|PF
!width="40"|PA
!width="40"|+/-
!width="40"|Pts
|- 
|align=left| 
|3||3||0||0||116||5||111||9
|- 
|align=left| 
|3||1||0||2||50||64||-14||5
|- 
|align=left| 
|3||1||0||2||36||57||-21||5
|- 
|align=left| 
|3||1||0||2||28||104||-76||5
|}

Pool F
{| class="wikitable" style="text-align: center;"
|-
!width="200"|Team
!width="40"|Pld
!width="40"|W
!width="40"|D
!width="40"|L
!width="40"|PF
!width="40"|PA
!width="40"|+/-
!width="40"|Pts
|- 
|align=left| 
|3||3||0||0||89||29||60||9
|- 
|align=left| 
|3||2||0||1||82||28||54||7
|- 
|align=left| 
|3||1||0||2||46||76||-30||5
|- 
|align=left| 
|3||0||0||3||38||122||-84||3
|}

Knockout

Shield

Bowl

Plate

Cup

 was the third team to score 1,000 overall points after finishing on top of Group F

Statistics

Individual points

Individual tries

References

External links
Pools and Matches Set for Hong Kong Sevens

2010
rugby union
2009–10 IRB Sevens World Series
2010 in Asian rugby union
March 2010 sports events in Asia